The International Journal of Health Planning and Management is a quarterly peer-reviewed scientific journal covering health policy. It was established in 1985 and is published by John Wiley & Sons. The editor-in-chief is Tiago Correia (NOVA University Lisbon). According to the Journal Citation Reports, the journal has a 2021 impact factor of 2.298, ranking it 60th out of 88 journals in the category "Health Policy & Services".

References

2 ^ International Journal of Health Planning and Management, assessed 29/09/2022, <https://onlinelibrary.wiley.com/journal/10991751>

External links

Quarterly journals
Publications established in 1985
Wiley (publisher) academic journals
Health policy journals
English-language journals